The Oakland–Fraternal Cemetery is a historic cemetery on Barber Street in Little Rock, Arkansas. It actually consists of six originally separate cemeteries, and lies adjacent to the Little Rock National Cemetery, of which it was once a part. Portions of the cemetery are dedicated to Confederate war dead, and its grounds include two separate Jewish cemeteries, and the Fraternal Cemetery.  The Fraternal side, established by the Grand United Order of Odd Fellows, was a burying ground for African Americans. The combined cemetery, listed on the National Register of Historic Places in 2010, continues in active use.

Notable burials

 Author Bernie Babcock (1868–1962)
 Civil War Union officer Henry C. Caldwell (1832–1915)
 Arkansas Governor James P. Clarke (1854–1916)
 Journalist and civil rights advocate Mifflin W. Gibbs (1823–1915) – Fraternal side
 Pulitzer Prize journalist Paul Greenburg (1937–2021)
 Arkansas Governor Daniel W. Jones (1839–1918)
 US Senator William M. Kavanaugh (1866–1915)
 Civil War Medal of Honor recipient John Kennedy (1814–1910)
 US Congressman Charles C. Reid (1868–1922)
 Civil War Confederate general John S. Roane (1817–1867)
 US Congressman Logan H. Roots (1841–1893)
 MLB player Jimmy Zinn (1895–1991)

See also

 National Register of Historic Places listings in Little Rock, Arkansas

References

External links
 

Buildings and structures completed in 1863
Cemeteries in Little Rock, Arkansas
Cemeteries on the National Register of Historic Places in Arkansas
Georgian architecture in Arkansas
National Register of Historic Places in Little Rock, Arkansas
Victorian architecture in Arkansas
Historic districts on the National Register of Historic Places in Arkansas
African-American cemeteries in Arkansas
Odd Fellows cemeteries in the United States
Cemeteries established in the 1860s